Nathaniel James, known as Nate James, (born February 20, 1945) is a former college football and track star at Florida A&M University (FAMU). He was drafted into the NFL by the Cleveland Browns and returned several kicks for the team. He was inducted into the FAMU Hall of Fame in 1990.

James attended segregated Union Academy (Bartow, Florida) where he was coached by Claude Woodruff. James recalled Woodruff as a hardline disciplinarian who had a saying: kill a mosquito with an ax, but go sharpen the ax first.

He was part of the FAMU track and field team that won Penn Relays four years in a row. 

In 1968 he was drafted by the Cleveland Browns in the 6th round. He appeared in 12 games for the team.

As of 1990, he had been teaching and coaching in Orange County, Florida for 15 years.

References

1945 births
Living people
American football defensive backs
Florida A&M Rattlers football players
Cleveland Browns players
Florida A&M Rattlers track and field athletes